Mahmud Yunus (Old Spelling: Mahmoed Joenoes) (February 10, 1899 – January 16, 1982) was an Indonesian Minangkabau Islamic preacher and teacher. He authored over seventy-five books, including Tafsir Qur'an Karim ("Interpretation of the Karim Koran") and an Arab-Indonesian dictionary. His books are used in madarsas and pesantrens. During his employment in the Indonesian Department of Religion, he promoted the incorporation of religious lessons into the national education curriculum. Yunus received an Honorary Doctorate in "tarbiyah" (the teaching of personal development) from IAIN Syarif Hidayatullah, Jakarta. A road to IAIN Imam Bonjol, Padang is named after him.

Early in his career, Yunus taught at a surau and at a Madrasa School of which he was an alumnus. He joined Persatuan Guru Agama Islam (P.G.A.I) the Association of Indonesian Teachers. In 1923, he studied in Cairo, Egypt. In 1931, Yunus returned to the village of his birth. In 1932, he taught in Padang and founded the Normal Islam School. Later, he was the principal of Sekolah Tinggi Islam (S.T.I.) Padang, the Padang Islamic High School.

During Japanese occupation, Yunus worked for the government on Islamic education issues. Yunus' promotion of Islamic education began with its introduction in Minangkabau. On January 20, 1951, religious studies were adopted as a part of national curriculum. Then, on June 1, 1957, Yunus was appointed the first director of Akademi Dinas Ilmu Agama (A.D.I.A.), the Service Academy of Religious Sciences in Jakarta (Syarif Hidayatullah State Islamic University Jakarta). From 1967 to 1970, Yunus was director of the Institut Agama Islam Negeri Imam Bonjol.

Yunus died on January 16, 1982, aged 82.

References

Bibliography

External links
 Mahmud Yunus in Islamic Religion Education Directorate

1899 births
1982 deaths
Indonesian schoolteachers
Indonesian Islamic religious leaders
People from Tanah Datar Regency